Salah Mejri (born June 15, 1986) is a Tunisian professional basketball player for Kazma. He also represents the senior Tunisian national basketball team internationally. After a successful career in Europe, Mejri was the first (and only) Tunisian NBA player when he joined the Dallas Mavericks in 2015 as a 29-year-old rookie. He stayed in the NBA for four seasons before returning with the Real Madrid in 2019 offseason.

Professional career

Early career 
Mejri started playing basketball at the age of 20 for Étoile Sportive du Sahel in the Tunisian Basketball League. In September 2010, he signed a two-year contract with the Antwerp Giants of the Belgian League, and in August 2012, he moved to the Spanish League to play with Obradoiro CAB. In May 2013, he was named the Spanish League's Rising Star.

Real Madrid 
On July 8, 2013, Mejri signed with the Spanish club Real Madrid. He became the first Tunisian player in the history of Real Madrid and the EuroLeague. In the 2014–15 season, Real Madrid won the EuroLeague championship, after defeating Olympiacos, by a score of 78–59, in the EuroLeague Finals. Real Madrid eventually finished the season by also winning the Spanish League championship, after defeating Barcelona 3–0 in the league's finals series. Real Madrid thus won the triple crown that season.

Dallas Mavericks 
On July 30, 2015, Mejri signed with the NBA's Dallas Mavericks. On October 25, 2015, it was announced that Mejri had made the Mavericks' 2015–16 opening-night roster. Three days later, he made his debut for the Mavericks, becoming the first Tunisian to appear in an NBA game. He played in five of the team's first eight games to begin the season, before not playing again until January 13, 2016. With the team's regular starters all rested for their match-up with the Oklahoma City Thunder, Mejri managed 25 minutes off the bench, and recorded 17 points and 9 rebounds in a 108–89 loss to the Thunder. On January 24, with starting center Zaza Pachulia out injured, Mejri made just his eighth appearance for the Mavericks and started in place of Pachulia. In 29 minutes of action, he recorded 10 points, 11 rebounds and 3 blocks in a 115–104 loss to the Houston Rockets. On March 20, he recorded 13 points, 14 rebounds and 6 blocks in 32 minutes off the bench in a 132–120 overtime win over the Portland Trail Blazers. During his rookie season, he received multiple assignments to the Texas Legends, the Mavericks' D-League affiliate.

On June 30, 2016, Mejri underwent arthroscopic surgery for a right knee debridement. On February 1, 2017, he had 16 points and a career-high 17 rebounds in a 113–95 win over the Philadelphia 76ers. He was re-signed by the Mavericks on August 3, 2018, to a one-year-contract. He was waived on February 7, 2019, to open up a roster spot for Zach Randolph who the Mavericks acquired in a trade, but brought back three days later after Randolph was waived.

Return to Real Madrid 
On October 10, 2019, Mejri returned to Spanish EuroLeague club Real Madrid for the rest of the season. He did not play in the ACB final tournament and was replaced by Juan Nunez.

China
In September 2020, Mejri signed a one-year contract with Beijing Royal Fighters.

Kuwait
On September 16, 2021, Mejri signed in Kuwait with Al-Jahra of the Kuwaiti Division I Basketball League.

Beirut Club
On April 14, 2022, Mejri signed in Lebanon for Beirut Club of the Lebanese Basketball League.

Kazma 
In March 2023, Mejri made his debut for Kazma of Kuwait in the West Asia Super League (WASL), recording 19 points and 17 rebounds in a win over Shabab Al Ahli.

Career statistics

NBA

Regular season

|-
| style="text-align:left;"| 
| style="text-align:left;"| Dallas
| 34 || 6 || 11.7 || .628 || .000 || .587 || 3.6 || .3 || .2 || 1.1 || 3.7
|-
| style="text-align:left;"| 
| style="text-align:left;"| Dallas
| 73 || 11 || 12.4 || .642 || .333 || .590 || 4.2 || .2 || .4 || .8 || 2.9
|-
| style="text-align:left;"| 
| style="text-align:left;"| Dallas
| 61 || 1 || 12.0 || .642 || .000 || .576 || 4.0 || .6 || .4 || 1.1 || 3.5
|-
| style="text-align:left;"| 
| style="text-align:left;"| Dallas
| 36 || 4 || 11.1 || .491 || .324 || .625 || 3.6 || 1.0 || .3 || .7 || 3.9
|-class="sortbottom"
| style="text-align:center;" colspan="2"|Career
| 204 || 22 || 11.9 || .603 || .293 || .590 || 4.0 || .5 || .4 || .9 || 3.4

Playoffs

|-
| style="text-align:left;" | 2016
| style="text-align:left;" | Dallas
| 4 || 1 || 19.0 || .700 || .000 || .417 || 3.3 || .3 || .8 || 1.3 || 4.8
|-class="sortbottom"
| style="text-align:center;" colspan="2"|Career
| 4 || 1 || 19.0 || .700 || .000 || .417 || 3.3 || .3 || .8 || 1.3 || 4.8

EuroLeague

|-
| style="text-align:left;"| 2013–14
| style="text-align:left;" rowspan=2| Real Madrid
| 26 || 2 || 10.1 || .603 || .667 || .545 || 2.9 || .1 || .4 || 1.1 || 3.5 || 5.6
|-
| style="text-align:left;background:#AFE6BA;"| 2014–15†
| 9 || 0 || 9.6 || .600 || .000 || .476 || 2.3 || .1 || .4 || .8 || 4.4 || 4.8
|- class="sortbottom"
| style="text-align:center;" colspan="2"| Career
| 35 || 2 || 10.0 || .602 || .500 || .512 || 2.8 || .1 || .4 || 1.0 || 3.7 || 5.4

National team career
Mejri is a member of the senior men's Tunisian national basketball team. He played center for the team in the 2009 FIBA Africa Championship, and helped the team to the bronze medal, and its first-ever trip to the FIBA World Cup.

In 2011, Mejri was named MVP, as Tunisia won the 2011 FIBA Africa Championship, and received an invitation to the 2012 Summer Olympics in London. There, the team finished 0–5; however, he led all competitors in blocked shots, with 17, despite only playing in 5 matches (some teams played in as many as 8 matches).

References

External links

Salah Mejri at acb.com 
Salah Mejri at euroleague.net

Salah Mejri at fiba.com (game-center)

1986 births
Living people
Tunisian Muslims
2010 FIBA World Championship players
2019 FIBA Basketball World Cup players
Antwerp Giants players
Al-Jahra SC basketball players
Basketball players at the 2012 Summer Olympics
Centers (basketball)
Competitors at the 2013 Mediterranean Games
Dallas Mavericks players
Étoile Sportive du Sahel basketball players
Liga ACB players
Mediterranean Games bronze medalists for Tunisia
Mediterranean Games medalists in basketball
Obradoiro CAB players
Olympic basketball players of Tunisia
People from Jendouba Governorate
Beirut Club players
Real Madrid Baloncesto players
Texas Legends players
Tunisian expatriate basketball people in Belgium
Tunisian expatriate basketball people in Spain
Tunisian expatriate sportspeople in the United States
Tunisian men's basketball players
Undrafted National Basketball Association players
Expatriate basketball people in the United States
Tunisian expatriate basketball people in Kuwait
Kazma SC basketball players